Kåre Gudbrand Kristiansen (11 March 1920 – 3 December 2005) was a Norwegian politician active in the Christian People's Party. Noted as a conservative within his own party, he was known to take controversial positions at odds with the prevailing consensus.

Kristiansen was born in Bergen, the son of a lay preacher. Both his parents were active in The Salvation Army. He started his professional life as a telegraph operator in the Norwegian railroad system, where he rose through the ranks.  A devout Christian all his life, he became politically active in his home community of Nesodden in 1951. He was appointed State Secretary in the Ministry of Social Affairs in 1965 and served in this capacity until 1968. He was elected to Storting, first as a deputy member in 1969 and as a full member from 1973 to 1977 and 1981 to 1989. He was chairman in the parliamentary foreign affairs committee from 1981 to 1983 and Minister of Petroleum and Energy from 1983 to 1986.

He served as chairman for the Christian People's Party from 1975 to 1977 and 1979 to 1983. As a result of an internal dispute about how to cooperate with the Conservative Party, he resigned from the chair of his party and instead became parliamentary leader.

He stepped down from national politics in 1989 in protest against what he perceived as a change in course in the party's policy, but he remained politically active all his life, among other things by rejoining the municipal council of Nesodden, where he had started his political career.

Kristiansen stood his ground on a number of political issues, and his prominence within his party and in politics in general varied accordingly. He was a proponent of Norwegian membership in the European Union, advocated strong collaborative efforts with the Conservative Party and even the Norwegian Progress Party.  He was an ardent supporter of the State of Israel, and in 1994 he resigned from the Norwegian Nobel Committee in protest over the award of the prize to Yasser Arafat, whom he labeled "world's most prominent terrorist". He opposed Israel's unilateral disengagement plan from the Gaza Strip, to the point of refusing an invitation to join in an event that also featured moderate Israeli politician and chief rabbi of Norway, Michael Melchior.

References 

1920 births
2005 deaths
Norwegian state secretaries
Members of the Storting
Petroleum and energy ministers of Norway
Christian Democratic Party (Norway) politicians
Norwegian anti-abortion activists
Christian Zionists
Norwegian Zionists
Politicians from Oslo
People from Nesodden
20th-century Norwegian politicians